The 2nd Alpine Division "Tridentina" was a division of the Royal Italian Army during World War II, which specialized in mountain warfare. The Alpini that formed the divisions are a highly decorated and elite mountain corps of the Italian Army comprising both infantry and artillery units. The name Tridentina was chosen as the division was based in the Trentino-South Tyrol region, for which the fascist regime of Benito Mussolini had created the neologism Venezia Tridentina. After World War II, the traditions and name of the 2nd Alpine Division "Tridentina" were carried on by the Alpine Brigade "Tridentina".

History 
The division's lineage begins with the II Alpine Brigade formed on 11 March 1926 in Verona with the 5th Alpini Regiment in Milan, 6th Alpini Regiment in Brixen, and 7th Alpini Regiment in Belluno and the 2nd Mountain Artillery Regiment in Bergamo. On 27 October 1934 the brigade changed its name to II Superior Alpine Command, which received the name Tridentino in December of the same year.

On 10 September 1935 the II Superior Alpine Command "Tridentino" was reformed as 2nd Alpine Division "Tridentina" with the 5th and 6th Alpini regiments and the 2nd Alpine Artillery Regiment, while the 7th Alpini Regiment was transferred to the 3rd Alpine Division "Julia". On 25 December 1935 the Tridentina temporarily transferred its Alpini Battalion "Trento" and one battery from its alpine artillery regiment to the 5th Alpine Division "Pusteria" for the Second Italo-Ethiopian War.

World War II

Invasion of France 
The division participated in the Italian invasion of France in June 1940. On 21-23 June it participated in the attack on the Little St Bernard Pass.

Greco-Italian War 
In November 1940 the division was transferred to Albania for the Greco-Italian War. By 23 November the division had entered the front in the upper Devoll valley, but by December it was in retreat during the Greek counter-offensive. During the Battle of Greece the division pursued the retreating Greek forces to Leskovik and Ersekë. After the war's conclusion the division returned to Italy.

Soviet Union 
The Tridentina was one of the ten Italian divisions of the Italian Army in Russia, which fought on the Eastern Front. In July 1942 the division, together with the 3rd Alpine Division "Julia" and the 4th Alpine Division "Cuneense" formed the Alpine Army Corps, which was transferred to Eastern Ukraine. From there the Tridentina marched to Millerovo and then onward to the Don river, where it took up positions near Podgornoye by October 1942.

On 12 December 1942 the Red Army's Operation Little Saturn commenced, which in its first stage attacked and encircled the Italian Army in Russia's II Army Corps and XXXV Army Corps. On 13 January 1943, the Red Army launched the second stage of Operation Little Saturn: four armies of General Filipp Golikov's Voronezh Front attacked, encircled, and destroyed the Hungarian Second Army near Svoboda on the Don to the northwest of the Alpine Army Corps and pushed back the remaining units of the German XXIV Army Corps on the Alpine Army Corps' left flank, thus encircling the Alpine Army Corps.

On the evening of 17 January, the Alpine Army Corps commander, General Gabriele Nasci, ordered a full retreat. At this point only the Tridentina division was still capable of conducting effective combat operations. The 40,000-strong mass of stragglers — Alpini and Italians from other commands, plus German and Hungarian Hussars — formed two columns that followed the Tridentina division which, supported by a handful of German armored vehicles, led the way westwards to the Axis lines.

On the morning of 26 January, the spearheads of the Tridentina reached the hamlet of Nikolayevka, occupied by the 48th Guards Rifle Division. The Soviets had fortified the railway embankment on both sides of the village. General Nasci ordered a frontal assault and at 9:30 am the Battle of Nikolayevka began with the 6th Alpini Regiment with the battalions "Verona", "Val Chiese", and "Vestone", the Tridentina division's II Mixed Alpine Engineer Battalion, the Alpine Artillery Group "Bergamo" of the 2nd Alpine Artillery Regiment, and three German Sturmgeschütz III leading the attack. By noon the Italian forces had reached the outskirts of the village and the Alpine Army Corps' Chief of Staff General Giulio Martinat brought up reinforcements: the 5th Alpini Regiment with the battalions "Edolo", "Morbegno" and "Tirano", and the remaining alpine artillery groups "Vicenza" and "Valcamonica" of the 2nd Alpine Artillery Regiment, as well as the remnants of the Alpini Battalion "L’Aquila" of the "Julia" division. General Martinat fell during this assault.

By sunset the Alpini battalions were still struggling to break the reinforced Soviet lines and in a last effort to decide the battle before nightfall General Luigi Reverberi, commander of the Tridentina, ordered the remaining troops and stragglers, which had arrived over the course of the afternoon, to assault the Soviet positions in a human wave attack. The assault managed to break open the Soviet lines and the Italian survivors managed to continue their retreat, which was no longer contested by Soviet forces. On 1 February 1943 the remnants of the Alpine Army Corps reached Axis lines. Only one third of the Tridentina had survived the battle on the Don and the retreat (approximately 4,250 survivors of 18,000 troops deployed).

Return to Italy 
The remnants of the division were repatriated in April 1943 and the division was reformed on 1 May 1943 with the 102nd Marching Alpini Regiment of the 8th Marching Division. After the announcement of the Armistice of Cassibile on 8 September 1943 the invading German forces disbanded the division.

Organization 
When the division was deployed to the Soviet Union it consisted of the following units:

  2nd Alpine Division "Tridentina", in Merano
  5th Alpini Regiment, in Merano
  Command and Command Company
  Alpini Battalion "Morbegno"
  Command Company
  44th, 45th, and 47th Alpini companies
  107th Support Weapons Company (Breda M37 machine guns, 45mm Mod. 35 and 81mm Mod. 35 mortars)
  Alpini Battalion "Tirano"
  Command Company
  46th, 48th, and 49th Alpini companies
  109th Support Weapons Company (Breda M37 machine guns, 45mm Mod. 35 and 81mm Mod. 35 mortars)
  Alpini Battalion "Edolo"
  Command Company
  50th, 51st, and 52nd Alpini companies
  110th Support Weapons Company (Breda M37 machine guns, 45mm Mod. 35 and 81mm Mod. 35 mortars)
  82nd Anti-tank Company (47/32 anti-tank guns)
  5th Supply Squad
  25th Train Section (Logistic Support)
 5th Medical Section
 618th Field Hospital
  6th Alpini Regiment, in Sterzing
  Command and Command Company
  Alpini Battalion "Vestone"
  Command Company
  53rd, 54th, and 55th Alpini companies
  111th Support Weapons Company (Breda M37 machine guns, 45mm Mod. 35 and 81mm Mod. 35 mortars)
  Alpini Battalion "Verona"
  Command Company
  56th, 57th, and 58th Alpini companies
  113th Support Weapons Company (Breda M37 machine guns, 45mm Mod. 35 and 81mm Mod. 35 mortars)
  Alpini Battalion "Val Chiese"
  Command Company
  253rd, 254th, and 255th Alpini companies
  112th Support Weapons Company (Breda M37 machine guns, 45mm Mod. 35 and 81mm Mod. 35 mortars)
  216th Anti-tank Company (47/32 anti-tank guns)
  6th Supply Squad
  26th Train Section (Logistic Support)
 6th Medical Section
 621st Field Hospital
  2nd Alpine Artillery Regiment, in Merano
  Command and Command Unit
  Alpine Artillery Group "Vicenza" (75/13 mountain guns)
  19th Battery
  20th Battery
  45th Battery
  Ammunition and Supply Unit
  Alpine Artillery Group "Bergamo" (75/13 mountain guns)
  31st Battery
  32nd Battery
  33rd Battery
  Ammunition and Supply Unit
  Alpine Artillery Group "Val Camonica" (reserve unit raised in 1942 for the campaign in the Soviet Union, 105/11 mountain guns)
  28th Battery
  29th Battery
  Ammunition and Supply Unit
  56th Anti-aircraft Battery (20/65 Mod. 35 anti-aircraft guns)
  59th Anti-aircraft Battery (20/65 Mod. 35 anti-aircraft guns)
  76th Anti-tank Battery (75/39 anti-tank guns)
  II Mixed Alpine Engineer Battalion
  Command Platoon
  102nd Searchlight Section
  112th Telegraph and Radio Operators Company
  122nd Engineer Company
  5th Train Unit
  2nd Alpine Division Command Transport Squad
  61st Bakers Section
  110th Supply Section
 206th Transport Section
 126th Mixed Transport Platoon
 721st Heavy Transport Platoon
 722nd Heavy Transport Platoon
 946th Heavy Transport Platoon
 302nd Medical Section
 619th Field Hospital
 620th Field Hospital
 622nd Field Hospital
 623rd Field Hospital
 402nd Carabinieri Section
 417th Carabinieri Section
 201st Field Post Office

The division strength was 573 officers and 16,887 NCOs and soldiers for a total strength of 17,460 men. The division also had 176 horses, 4,698 mules and 584 transport vehicles at its disposal.

Military honors 
For their conduct during the Italian campaign in the Soviet Union the President of Italy awarded on 31 December 1947 to the three regiments of the 2nd Alpine Division "Tridentina" Italy's highest military honor, the Gold Medal of Military Valour. The 5th Alpini Regiment was also decorated for its conduct during the Greco-Italian War.

  5th Alpini Regiment on 9 June 1948
  5th Alpini Regiment on 31 December 1947
  6th Alpini Regiment on 31 December 1947
  2nd Alpine Artillery Regiment on 31 December 1947

Commanding officers 
The division's commanding officers were:

 Generale di Divisione Gabriele Nasci (31 October 1935 - 31 August 1938)
 Generale di Divisione Ugo Santovito (1 September 1938 - 1 April 1941)
 Generale di Brigata Luigi Reverberi (acting, 2-13 April 1941)
 Generale di Divisione Ugo Santovito (14 April 1941 - 2 August 1941)
 Generale di Divisione Luigi Reverberi (3 August 1941 - 8 September 1943)

Today 

In 2002 the Italian Army decided to raise three division commands, with one of the three always readily deployable for NATO missions. The army decided that each of the three should carry on the traditions of one of the divisions that served with distinction in World War II. Therefore, on 1 January 2003 the Division Command "Tridentina" was activated in Bolzano which carries on the traditions of the 2nd Alpine Division "Tridentina" and the Alpine Brigade "Tridentina".

See also
 Italian Army in Russia

References 

Alpini divisions of Italy
Divisions of Italy in World War II
Military units and formations established in 1935
Military units and formations disestablished in 1943